The West Virginia Insurance Commission, is the state agency that regulates the insurance industry and charged with overseeing the practices of insurance companies and protect the interests of policyholders and public.

Divisions

The commission has four primary divisions; Consumer Advocate Division, Consumer Services Division, Financial Conditions Division, and Fraud Unit.

Insurance Commissioner

As the head of the agency, the insurance commissioner oversees the state's insurance business and carry out the responsibilities of the agency. The current commissioner is James A. Dodrill who was appointed by Governor Jim Justice and went effective on March 4, 2019.

List of past commissioners

References

External links
 Official Website

State agencies of West Virginia